Colleano may refer to:

Bonar Colleano (1924–1958), American actor
Con Colleano (1899–1973), Australian tightrope walker

See also
 Colliano
 Collegno
 Collesano